Hiam is a district of Houaphanh province, Laos.

References 

Districts of Laos